Gary Richardson may refer to:
 Gary Richardson (Arizona politician), member of the Arizona State Senate, 1995–1999
 Gary Richardson (lawyer) (born 1941), American lawyer and political candidate in Oklahoma
 Gary Richardson (American football) (1935–2002), American football coach and player
 Gary Richardson (producer)
 Gary Richardson (sailor)

See also

 Garry Richardson, British radio presenter